Marcel Le Picard (1887–1952) was a French cinematographer known for his work on American films. He shot around two hundred films between 1916 and 1953. He did much of his prolific work for low-budget studios such as Republic Pictures, Monogram Pictures and Producers Releasing Corporation.

Selected filmography

 The Outlaw's Revenge (1915)
 A Daughter of the Gods (1916)
 Day Dreams (1919)
 Through the Wrong Door (1919)
 Leave It to Susan (1919)
 Water, Water, Everywhere (1920)
 Cyclone Jones (1923)
 I Am the Man (1924)
 White Mice (1926)
 The Broadway Boob (1926)
 Back to Liberty (1927)
 His Rise to Fame (1927)
 Combat (1927)
 The Winning Oar (1927)
 The Broadway Drifter (1927)
 Inspiration (1928)
 The Legion of Missing Men (1937)
 The Shadow Strikes (1937)
 Man from Texas (1939)
 The Golden Trail (1940)
 Roll Wagons Roll (1940)
 Invisible Ghost (1941)
 Bowery Blitzkrieg (1941)
 Murder by Invitation (1941)
 Silver Stallion (1941)
 The Pioneers (1941)
 Gentleman from Dixie (1941)
 Riot Squad (1941)
 Miss V from Moscow (1942)
 Phantom Killer (1942)
 The Panther's Claw (1942)
 The Yanks Are Coming (1942)
 One Thrilling Night (1942)
 Submarine Base (1943)
 The Girl from Monterrey (1943)
 Voodoo Man (1944)
 A Fig Leaf for Eve (1944)
 What a Man! (1944)
 Shadow of Suspicion (1944)
 Law of the Valley (1944)
 Gangs of the Waterfront (1945)
 A Sporting Chance (1945)
 Forgotten Women (1949)
 Jet Job (1952)

References

Bibliography
 John T. Soister, Henry Nicolella, Steve Joyce. American Silent Horror, Science Fiction and Fantasy Feature Films, 1913-1929. McFarland, 2014.

External links

1887 births
1952 deaths
French emigrants to the United States
French cinematographers
People from Le Havre